Vector Unit is a video game developer founded in December 2007 by Ralf Knoesel and Matt Small.  The company is best known for its title, Hydro Thunder Hurricane, released on the Xbox 360 via Xbox Live Arcade in 2010.

History
Vector Unit was founded in December 2007 by Ralf Knoesel and Matt Small.  The two originally worked together on Blood Wake at Stormfront Studios.  Following Blood Wake, Small took a job with EA Redwood Shores.  Knoesel and Small kept in contact, and started a small side project.  One night, Small received a message from Knoesel which read "So I've been having these thoughts... about quitting and doing the small games thing."  The two decided to quit their job and begin their studio.  Vector Unit was incorporated on January 28, 2008.

Although officially the company consists of only two employees, a team of five contractors were brought in to complete their first title, Hydro Thunder Hurricane.  Creative Director Matt Small was interviewed on the difficulties of starting a new company by Gamasutra in April 2010. Small noted that with a small team members are required to take on multiple roles. "You get to choose at least 80 percent of the time which hats you wear, and then sometimes you end up forced into wearing a particular hat."

Technology
Vector Unit uses a proprietary engine known as the Vector Engine to develop their games.  The engine allows for real time "baking" of assets; when assets are first run in the game, they are optimized for that particular platform.  Visual scripting is used to allow editors to write scripted events without a comprehensive understanding of code.  FMOD is used for audio and Bullet Physics Library handles all in-game physics.  3D models are created in Maya and artists are able to see how the asset would look in-game via a plugin.  Level construction and placement of props are done in BarracudaEditor, the team's level design tool.  During the development of Hydro Thunder Hurricane, Vector Unit maintained a PC build of the game which allowed artists and other team members to test their assets in-game without moving to an Xbox 360 Debug Kit.

Games developed

Additional work

References

External links

American companies established in 2007
Video game companies of the United States
Video game development companies
Companies based in San Rafael, California
Video game companies established in 2007
2007 establishments in California